Spadavecchia is an Italian surname. Notable people with the surname include:

Antonio Spadavecchia (1907–1988), Russian classical composer
John Spadavecchia, American poker player
Vitangelo Spadavecchia (born 1982), Italian footballer

Italian-language surnames